Richard Oliver may refer to:

 Richard Oliver (cricketer) (born 1989), British cricket player
 Richard Oliver (field hockey) (born 1944), British Olympic hockey player
 Richard Oliver (New Zealand politician) (1830–1910), New Zealand politician who represented Dunedin
 Richard Oliver (Paralympian) (born 1955), Australian Paralympic athlete and wheelchair basketball player
 Richard Oliver (priest) (died 1689), Anglican priest
 Richard Oliver (radical) (1735–1784), British merchant, plantation owner and politician
 Richard Philip Oliver (1763–1843), Irish MP for County Limerick
 Jamie Oliver (musician) (Richard James Oliver, born 1975), musician with Welsh alternative metal band Lostprophets